Newport Point is the south entrance point to Horseshoe Bay in west Ross Island. Newport Point was named by the New Zealand Geographic Board (NZGB) after Terry Newport, a carpenter in the NZ Antarctic Programme, who perished in a helicopter crash near this point in October 1992.

Headlands of Ross Island